Dean Parata (born 4 October 1991) is an Italy international rugby league footballer who plays as a  for London Broncos in the Betfred Championship.

Parata has previously played for the Barrow Raiders, Toulouse Olympique and Featherstone Rovers in the Championship.

Background
Parata was born in Sydney, New South Wales, Australia.

Early life 
Of Italian descent, Parata attended Keebra Park State High School and played his junior rugby league for the Nerang Roosters in the Gold Coast, Queensland. After being signed by the Wests Tigers, he moved to Sydney and attended Holy Cross College, Ryde.

Playing career
Parata played 25 games for the Tigers in the National Youth Competition between 2009 and 2011. At the time of his selection for the 2013 World Cup, Parata was playing for the Parramatta Eels' feeder team, the Wentworthville Magpies in the New South Wales Cup. He later joined the Blacktown Workers Sea Eagles in the same competition, and was selected to represent Italy at the 2017 World Cup qualifying tournament in 2016. Parata was named as a shadow player for Italy at the 2017 World Cup.

He played for the Blacktown Workers Sea Eagles.

He spent the 2018 season playing for the Barrow Raiders in the Betfred Championship.

He was selected to represent his family heritage - Italy at the 2022 postponed 2021 Rugby League World Cup

He started at hooker for Italy against Scotland - looking very slick with ball in hand scoring a try underneath the sticks, in the upset 28-6 win.

References

External links

2017 RLWC profile
Italy profile

1991 births
Living people
Australian people of Italian descent
Australian rugby league players
Barrow Raiders players
Blacktown Workers players
Featherstone Rovers players
Italy national rugby league team players
London Broncos players
Rugby league hookers
Rugby league players from Sydney
Toulouse Olympique players
Wentworthville Magpies players